The Brass Teapot is a 2012 American fantasy film directed by Ramaa Mosley. The movie's script was written by Tim Macy, who also wrote the short story on which the movie is based. The movie premiered at the Toronto International Film Festival on September 8, 2012, and was released into theaters and video on demand on April 5, 2013.

Synopsis
John and Alice are a down-on-their-luck couple who come across a magical brass teapot capable of providing them with money. The only catch is that they must experience pain in order for the teapot to provide. They must then decide what they are willing to do (and what they are willing to suffer through) in order to gain financial security.

Cast
 Juno Temple as Alice
 Michael Angarano as John
 Alexis Bledel as Payton
 Alia Shawkat as Louise
 Bobby Moynihan as Chuck
 Ben Rappaport as Ricky
 Billy Magnussen as Arnie
 Steve Park as Dr. Li Ling
 Lucy Walters as Mary
 Claudia Mason as Donna
 Debra Monk as Trudy
 Thomas Middleditch as Habab
 Cristin Milioti as Brandi
 Nick Frazier as Wedding Bartender

Reception
The Brass Teapot garnered negative reviews from critics. It holds a 31% approval rating on Rotten Tomatoes, based on 32 reviews, with an average rating of 4.7/10. The Film.com review said: "Despite the sometimes patchy moments The Brass Teapot by and large squeaks by as an enjoyable entertainment."  The Playlist commented that: "With the help of a talented cast, The Brass Teapot is able to coast on charm."

Hitflix writes: "It is apparent that Ramaa Mosley has a voice, and that The Brass Teapot is a focused, controlled piece of storytelling that displays real control". The Wall Street Journal said: "Alice and John are good company — especially Alice, thanks to Ms. Temple's buoyant humor and lovely poignancy. The problem comes when the couple gets greedy, the gods grow angry and the tone turns dark. It doesn't stay dark, but getting back to the brightness is a painful process."

Nicolas Rapold of The New York Times criticized the film, saying that while the two lead characters were interesting, the "movie's best bits lose out to the requisite moral turnaround". Rob Hunter of Film School Rejects commented that the darker points of the film's story line were "ill fitting" in contrast with the predominantly "comically light and slapsticky" tone of the overall movie. In contrast, Peter Debruge of Variety gave a more positive review for the film, saying that Mosely "makes her low-budget enterprise look as slick as most midrange studio comedies, demonstrating herself a director with both imagination and technical ingenuity."

References

External links
 
 
 

2012 films
2012 black comedy films
2010s English-language films
2010s fantasy comedy-drama films
American black comedy films
American fantasy comedy-drama films
Films about wish fulfillment
Films based on short fiction
Films scored by Andrew Hewitt
Films shot in Bucharest
2010s American films